Verona station was a station on the Caldwell Branch of the Erie Railroad in Verona, New Jersey. The station was originally constructed in 1891 at the intersection of Depot Street and Personette Street by the Caldwell Railway, which was soon merged into the Erie Railroad system. The station burned down twice: the 1891 station depot burned down in 1905, and the second station survived until April 1, 1962, when arsonists destroyed it.

However, the freight station built in 1891, a one-room shed, remained standing between both burnings, and although passenger service on the Caldwell Branch ended on October 3, 1966 (and the tracks removed in 1979), the freight station in Verona is the only remaining structure left of the entire line. In 2010, the town of Verona proposed to restore the old freight shed, which stands along the right-of-way as a one-room museum. Also that year, the shed was added as the first of Verona's local landmarks by its historical commission.

History

Early starts for Verona (1891–1905) 
The first station at Verona was built in 1891 as one of the original stations on the Caldwell Railway, a short branch line off the New York and Greenwood Lake Railroad. When the rail line opened on August 3, 1891, the line served Verona along with Overbrook Hospital (at that point also in Verona) and the neighboring borough of Caldwell. The service on the Caldwell Railway was taken over by the New York & Greenwood Lake in 1896, which was leased by the Erie Railroad a year later. The first station building burned down fourteen years later. The freight station nearby avoided catching fire and did remain in service. When neighboring Caldwell got a new station depot built by the Erie, a team of horses carted the old 1891 station depot through the snow to Verona and installed it as the new station. The relocated station building was a one-story wooden batten depot.

The end of the Caldwell Branch (1966–1979) 
Change remained slim from 1905 to 1960 in Verona with the daily commuter services from Essex Fells to Jersey City's Pavonia Terminal. On April 1, 1962, the station depot moved from Caldwell in 1905 was burned down by arsonists. Rather than building a third station depot, the Erie Railroad, which was experiencing major financial difficulties, put up a three-sided metal shelter for commuters. Once again, the 1891 freight shed survived the passenger station catching fire. By 1962, the station saw only two commuter trains to the new terminus, Hoboken Terminal in Hoboken, New Jersey. To add to the problem, the station lost all passenger service under the new Erie-Lackawanna Railroad on September 30, 1966 after the Interstate Commerce Commission approved services could be cut on the branches losing money. After serving passengers of Cedar Grove, Verona, Caldwell and Essex Fells for 75 years, the Caldwell Branch was reduced to a costly freight service for companies in Cedar Grove and Verona.

In the summer of 1975, a major storm washed away the usability of the tracks of the Caldwell Branch, and although the New Jersey Department of Transportation was willing to put in money for a grant to get the tracks rehabilitated, a lack of interested corporations ended the investment. It ended up the branch would not be absorbed into the Consolidated Rail Corporation (Conrail) in 1975, unlike most of the Erie Lackawanna system. On April 1, 1976, the Erie Lackawanna system was absorbed into Conrail. In June 1979, the dormant tracks of the Caldwell Branch were removed from Essex Fells to Great Notch.

Freight station restoration (2010–present) 
On July 12, 2010, the Verona township council named the former freight house the township's first historical landmark. There are plans by the Verona Historical Society to turn the freight house, the sole surviving structure of the Caldwell Branch, into a single room museum and possibly move the shed to a more accessible part of Verona. (The bridge over Runneymede Lane in Essex Fells was demolished in 2000). According to the historical society, the station is in good structural shape.

See also 
West Arlington station - A station closed on September 30, 1966 along with the Caldwell Branch.
Great Notch station

Bibliography

References

External links 

Verona Landmarks Preservation Commission
View of the blue.com - Photography Stations, towers, etc., New Jersey, 1969-71 B&W set

Verona
Railway stations in Essex County, New Jersey
Infrastructure completed in 1891
1891 establishments in New Jersey
Railway stations in the United States opened in 1891
Railway stations closed in 1966
Former railway stations in New Jersey
1966 disestablishments in New Jersey